Styrian Spirit was an airline based in Graz, Austria, the capital of Styria. It operated services to scheduled and charter destinations within Europe.

The airline also operated as Slovenian Spirit and Salzburg Spirit on routes to and from Salzburg and Maribor, Slovenia. Two of its aircraft were painted in Salzburg Spirit and Slovenian Spirit livery.

History
The airline was established on December 25, 2002, and started operations on March 24, 2003. It ceased operations on March 24, 2006, and filed for bankruptcy after failing to secure fresh financing.

On March 24, 2006, Styrian Spirit abruptly canceled all flights. The carrier later announced it was declaring bankruptcy.

Destinations
Styrian Spirit final routes prior to airline closure (December 2005):

Graz
Salzburg
Klagenfurt

Berlin
Stuttgart

Paris

Kraków

London-Luton

Maribor

Zürich

Fleet
The airline operated a fleet of four Bombardier CRJ200s.

References

External links

Styrian Spirit fleet

Defunct airlines of Austria
Airlines established in 2002
Airlines disestablished in 2006
Austrian companies established in 2002
2006 disestablishments in Austria
Economy of Styria